Pleasant Valley School District is a mid-sized, rural, public school district in the west end of Monroe County, Pennsylvania in the United States. The district encompasses approximately  including: Chestnuthill, Eldred, Polk, and Ross Townships, as well as communities in them, such as Brodheadsville. According to 2000 federal census data, it served a resident population of 29,051. By 2010, the US Census Bureau reported the district's population increased to 33,891 people. In 2009, the district residents' per capita income was $19,853, while the median family income was $51,433. In the Commonwealth, the median family income was $49,501 and the United States median family income was $49,445, in 2010. The educational attainment levels for the school district population (25 years old and over) were 89.5% high school graduates and 17.9% college graduates.

Schools
The district operates four schools.
Pleasant Valley Elementary School K-2
Pleasant Valley Intermediate School 3-5
Pleasant Valley Middle School 6-8
Pleasant Valley High School 9-12

High school students may choose to attend Monroe Career & Tech Institute for training. The Colonial Intermediate Unit IU20 provides the district with a wide variety of services like specialized education for disabled students and hearing, speech and visual disability services and professional development for staff and faculty!

Extracurriculars
The Pleasant Valley School District offers a wide variety of clubs, activities and an extensive sports program.

Sports
The district funds:

Varsity

Boys
Baseball - AAAA
Basketball- AAAA
Cross country - AAA
Football - AAAA
Golf - AAA
Lacrosse - AAA
Soccer - AAA
Tennis - AAA
Track and field - AAA
Wrestling - AAA

Girls
Basketball - AAAA
Cheer - AAAA
Cross country - AAA
Field hockey - AAA
Lacrosse - AAA
Soccer - AAA
Softball - AAAA
Tennis - AAA
Track and field - AAA
Volleyball - AAA

Middle school sports

Boys
Basketball
Cross country
Football
Soccer
Track and field
Wrestling 

Girls
Basketball
Cross country
Field hockey
Soccer
Softball
Track and field
Volleyball

According to PIAA directory July 2013

References

School districts in Monroe County, Pennsylvania